Frederica Dorothy Violet Carrington, Lady Rose, MBE (6 June 1910 – 26 January 2002) was an expatriate British writer domiciled for over half her life in Corsica.  She was one of the twentieth century's leading scholars on the island's culture and history, about which she wrote numerous books and articles.

Early life
Dorothy Carrington was the daughter of Major General Sir Frederick Carrington, known for his crushing of the Matabele Rebellion and a friend of Cecil Rhodes. Her mother was Susan Elwes. Both her parents had died by the time she was eight.  Subsequently, she read English at St Margaret's Hall, Oxford from which she fled. Eventually, in 1936, she married an  Austrian, Franz Otto Resseguier Waldschutz, whose family estates in Poland had been destroyed during the First World War. Franz went out to Rhodesia, Africa, where she joined him for a short time but the wilderness did not suit her, so she returned to Europe in 1937.  However Franz preferred Rhodesia and stayed and built an estate called Wilton. They divorced in 1937. A second marriage, to Darcy Sproul-Bolton, ended with his death in the late 1930s.

She then immersed herself in the London art world, and in 1942 organised an exhibition at the Leicester Galleries, "Imaginative Art since the War". One of the exhibitors was the surrealist painter Sir Francis Rose, whom she married shortly afterwards.  He was a friend of Gertrude Stein.

Corsica
In July 1948, Carrington and Rose made the first of four trips to Corsica. She had intended to write a book and move on.  But in 1954 she settled on the island in Ajaccio, without Rose.  They divorced in 1966.

In 1971 she wrote her masterpiece, Granite Island. Later works included The Dream Hunters of Corsica, which examined the dark, threatening side of the Corsican psyche, and Napoleon And His Parents On The Threshold Of History. Partly as a result of her work, French archaeologists were persuaded to travel to Corsica and study the now famous megalithic site of Filitosa.

Dorothy Carrington was a Fellow of the Royal Historical Society and of the Royal Society of Literature. In 1986 she was made a Chevalier de l'Ordre des Arts et des Lettres. The University of Corsica gave her an honorary doctorate in 1991 and the Queen awarded her an MBE.  Granite Island won the Heinemann Award.

Major works
 The Traveller's Eye  (1947)
 The Mouse And The Mermaid (1948)
 This Corsica - The Complete Guide (1962)
 Granite Island: Portrait Of Corsica (1971)
 Napoleon And His Parents On The Threshold Of History (1988)
 The Dream Hunters Of Corsica (1995)

References

External links
Guardian Obituary
Daily Telegraph Obituary
Independent Obituary
Glasgow Herald Obituary
Scotsman Obituary
French Obituary

English travel writers
British women travel writers
Writers from Ajaccio
1910 births
2002 deaths
People from Cotswold District
Chevaliers of the Ordre des Arts et des Lettres
Members of the Order of the British Empire
Fellows of the Royal Society of Literature
Fellows of the Royal Historical Society
Wives of baronets
British expatriates in France